Child Abuse & Neglect is a monthly peer-reviewed interdisciplinary social science journal covering child protection. It was established in 1977 and is the official journal of the International Society for Prevention of Child Abuse and Neglect. It is published by Elsevier and the editor-in-chief is Christine Wekerle (McMaster University). According to the Journal Citation Reports, the journal has a 2017 impact factor of 2.899.

References

External links

Multidisciplinary social science journals
Elsevier academic journals
Publications established in 1977
Monthly journals
English-language journals
Academic journals associated with international learned and professional societies
Works about child abuse